Douce River may refer to:
Douce River (Dominica)
Douce River (Grenada)